The Faculty of Medicine and Health is a constituent body of the University of Sydney in New South Wales, Australia. It was launched on 30 April 2018.

History
As part of the University's Strategic Plan 2016-2020, an international panel was convened and recommended that the establishment of a single, integrated Faculty of Medicine and Health be established to ensure the university was well-positioned to address challenges of healthcare in the 21st century. The University Senate approved the establishment of the new faculty in 2016.

In 2017, Professor Alan Pettigrew was appointed as the Transition Manager for the Faculty of Medicine and Health. In October of the same year it was announced that Professor Robyn Ward  would join the University as the Executive Dean of the Faculty of Medicine and Health from July 2018. Professor Pettigrew was appointed Acting Executive Dean from January to July 2018.

Schools
The faculty is made up of seven schools, seven clinical schools, and three rural clinical schools.

Schools
 The University of Sydney School of Dentistry
 The University of Sydney School of Medicine
 The University of Sydney School of Health Sciences
 School of Medical Sciences
 The University of Sydney Susan Wakil School of Nursing and Midwifery
 The University of Sydney School of Pharmacy
 The University of Sydney School of Public Health

Clinical schools
 The University of Sydney Central Clinical School
 The University of Sydney Children's Hospital Westmead Clinical School
 The University of Sydney Concord Clinical School
 The University of Sydney Nepean Clinical School
 The University of Sydney Northern Clinical School
 The University of Sydney, Sydney Adventist Hospital Clinical School
 The University of Sydney Westmead Clinical School

Rural Clinical Schools
 The Broken Hill University Department of Rural Health
 School of Rural Health (Dubbo/Orange)
 The University Centre for Rural Health

Centres and institutes
There are also a number of research institutes and centres attached to the faculty, such as the Matilda Centre for Research in Mental Health and Substance Use, the Centre for Disability Research and Policy, the Menzies Centre for Health Policy and Economics and the Poche Centre for Indigenous Health.

References

External links
 

Nursing
Nursing schools in Australia
2018 establishments in Australia